The following is a list of Iranians or people of Iranian descent by net worth who are reported by Forbes and other mainstream news outlets to have estimated net worth in excess of US$500 million.

Forbes''' billionaires list==

==Previous Forbes''' billionaires

Other reported billionaires and multi-millionaires

See also
 Asadollah Asgaroladi - Iran's richest person
 Forbes list of billionaires
 List of countries by the number of billionaires

References

Lists of people by wealth
 
Economy of Iran-related lists